Talkhab (also Romanized as Talkhāb; also known as Talkhā) is a village in Susan-e Sharqi Rural District, Susan District, Izeh County, Khuzestan Province, Iran. At the 2006 census, its population was 158, in 33 families.

References 

Populated places in Izeh County